Events in the year 1921 in the British Mandate of Palestine.

Incumbents
 High Commissioner – Sir Herbert Louis Samuel
 Emir of Transjordan – Abdullah I bin al-Hussein from 11 April
 Prime Minister of Transjordan – Rashid Tali’a from 11 April until 15 August; Mazhar Raslan

Events

 12 March – Start of Cairo Conference which agrees that the administration of Transjordan should be separated from that of Palestine.
 11 April – The establishment of the Emirate of Transjordan, which continues to remain part of the British Mandate of Palestine.
 1 May–7 May – Jaffa riots: Riots in Jaffa result in the death of 47 Jews (including the author Yosef Haim Brenner) and 48 Arabs.
 25 June – Fourth Palestine Arab Congress held in Jerusalem.
 October – The Haycraft Commission of Inquiry publishes its findings on the Jaffa Riots of the previous year.

Unknown dates
 The founding of the Hebrew Writers Association in the Land of Israel by Hayim Nahman Bialik.
 The founding of the kibbutz Tel Yosef by members of Gdud HaAvoda, named after Joseph Trumpeldor.
 The founding of the kibbutz Ein Harod by pioneers of the Third Aliyah.
 The founding of the moshav Nahalal by pioneers of the Second Aliyah and Third Aliyah.
 The founding of the moshava Ramat Gan.

Notable births

 6 January – Haim Corfu, Israeli politician (died 2015)
 16 January – Shmuel Toledano, Israeli politician and Mossad officer (died 2022)
 17 January – Dan Tolkowsky, Israeli military officer, commander of the Israeli Air Force, and venture capitalist
 17 January – Modi Alon, Israeli fighter pilot who commanded Israel's first fighter squadron, scored the first aerial victory of the Israeli Air Force (died 1948)
 17 March – Meir Amit, Israeli politician, general, and intelligence officer (died 2009)
18 March – Joseph Tabenkin, Israeli military commander (died 1987)
 9 April – Yitzhak Navon, Fifth President of Israel (died 2015)
 26 August – Shimshon Amitsur, Israeli mathematician (died 1994)
 15 September – Moshe Shamir, Israeli author, playwright, opinion writer, and public figure (died 2004).
 21 September – Yehoshafat Harkabi, Israeli military intelligence officer and Professor of International Relations (died 1994).
 18 November – Baruch Ben Haim, Sephardic rabbi, Chief Rabbi of the Syrian Jewish community in Brooklyn for 55 years (died 2005).
 2 October – Yisrael Peled, Israeli politician, second Mayor of Ramat Gan (died 2016).
Full date unknown
 Amos Hakham, Israeli Bible scholar (died 2012).

Notable deaths

 2 May – Yosef Haim Brenner (born 1881), Russian-born Palestinian Jew. Hebrew-language author, one of the pioneers of modern Hebrew literature
 5 May – Avshalom Gissin (born 1896), Zionist activist and Ottoman Army veteran killed defending Petah Tikva during the 1921 Palestine riots

References

 
Mandatory Palestine
Years in Mandatory Palestine
1920s in Mandatory Palestine
Palestine
Mandatory Palestine